The 2019 Denver Outlaws season was the fourteenth season for the Outlaws franchise of Major League Lacrosse. It was also the first season under head coach Tony Seaman, who previously served as general manager before B.J. O'Hara took the head coaching job for the New York Lizards.  The Denver Outlaws had a very strong team, having 7 players go to the All Star game.

Coming off of a 2018 championship season where the Outlaws again got off to a slow start (1-4) before rattling off a six-game win streak in the regular season and two postseason upsets over the second and top-seeded Chesapeake Bayhawks and Dallas Rattlers, hoisting the Steinfeld Trophy for the third time in five years on August 18 after defeating the Rattlers, 16-12 at MUSC Health Stadium in Charleston, South Carolina,  the Outlaws finished with a 9-7 record and returned to the championship game for the fourth consecutive year but would lose to the Chesapeake Bayhawks in a heartbreaker by the score of 10-9.

With the season starting six weeks later in the calendar year, the Outlaws played their last two home games at Peter Barton Lacrosse Stadium, on the campus of the University of Denver due to conflicting with the NFL season.

Transactions

Offseason
March 1 - The Outlaws and goalie Dillon Ward agreed to a one-year contract for 2019.
May 25 - 44-year-old John Grant Jr. announces he is coming out of retirement to suit up for the Outlaws in 2019. Grant Jr. was serving as the Outlaws' offensive coordinator the past two seasons and will be in a unique role as player-coach. He is currently second on the league's all-time scoring list behind Paul Rabil.

Collegiate Draft
The 2019 Collegiate Draft was held on March 9 in Charlotte, North Carolina at the NASCAR Hall of Fame. Inside Lacrosse gave the Outlaws an "B" in their team-by-team draft grades. 

On May 16, the Outlaws announced they had signed Chris Aslanian, Brandon Jones, and Kyle Pless from their draft class. Additionally, they signed rookies they picked up in the dispersal draft in Sean Eccles and Timmy Kelly. The signing of one of their first round picks, Daniel Bucaro, was announced on May 21.

Schedule

Standings

Broadcast
The Outlaws announced on June 13 that Altitude Sports would air all remaining Outlaws games (Denver had played three games so far in the season).

References

External links
 Team Website 

Major League Lacrosse seasons
Denver Outlaws